MetroCity AVM, opened on April 30, 2003, is a modern shopping mall on the Büyükdere Avenue in the finance and business quarter of 1. Levent in Istanbul, Turkey, with a direct connection to the Levent subway station. 

The complex comprises a shopping mall and three towers which rise above it: a 27-floor office tower on Büyükdere Avenue (31 floors when counted from the Zincirlikuyu level at the opposite side), and two residential towers, each having 31 floors (35 floors from Zincirlikuyu level).

See also
 List of shopping malls in Istanbul

References

External links
 MetroCity Official Website
 Emporis Buildings Database: MetroCity

Shopping malls in Istanbul
Şişli